Alfredo Daniel Lopes Bóia (born 28 November 1975) is a former Portuguese football player.

Club career
He made his Primeira Liga debut for União Leiria on 24 October 1999 in a game against Campomaiorense.

Honours
Portugal Under-18
UEFA European Under-18 Championship: 1994

References

External links
 

1975 births
People from Espinho, Portugal
Living people
Portuguese footballers
Portugal youth international footballers
Portugal under-21 international footballers
Amora F.C. players
Liga Portugal 2 players
F.C. Paços de Ferreira players
C.D. Aves players
A.D. Esposende players
U.D. Leiria players
Primeira Liga players
C.D. Nacional players
A.D. Ovarense players
Atlético Clube de Portugal players
Sarawak FA players
Portuguese expatriate footballers
Expatriate footballers in Malaysia
Association football defenders
CU Micaelense players
Sportspeople from Aveiro District